English folklore consists of the myths and legends of England, including the English region's mythical creatures, traditional recipes, urban legends, proverbs, superstitions, and folktales. Its cultural history is rooted in Celtic, Christian, and Germanic folklore.

During the Renaissance in the 16th century, England looked to more European texts to develop a national identity. English folklore has continued to differ according to region, although there are shared elements across the country.

Its folktales include the traditional Robin Hood tales and the Brythonic-inspired Arthurian legend, and their stories often contained a moral imperative stemming from Christian values. The folktales, characters and creatures are often derived from aspects of English experience, such as topography, architecture, real people, or real events.

History 

Before England was founded in the year 927, Wessex and its surrounding areas' cultures were transformed by the invasion of the Danish King Guthrum between 865 and 878. The king of Wessex, King Alfred, prevailed against King Guthrum's troops in 878 and King Guthrum was baptised and became the ruler of East Anglia. This continued the process of the assimilation of Norse words into the English language. Eventually English folklore melded with Norse traditions such as in their iconography, which became more Greek, and in their clothing and folktales which adopted more Nordic elements. The folklore of the people of England continued to be passed down through oral tradition.

During the Renaissance, artists captured these customs in the written word; such as Shakespearean plays' reflections of English folklore through their witches, fairies, folk medicine, marriage and funeral customs, superstitions, and religious beliefs.

The Grimm brothers' publications such as German Legends and Grimms' Fairy Tales were translated from their original German and distributed across Europe in 1816. Their stories inspired publishers such as William Thoms to compile legends from within English folklore and without to compose an English identity. The stories that the Grimm brothers collected were integrated into the English school curriculum throughout the 19th century as educators of morality.

Characteristics 
Although English folklore has many influences, its largest are its Christian, Celtic and Germanic. Non-Christian influences also defined English folklore up to the eleventh century, such as in their folksongs, celebrations and folktales. An example is the 305 ballads collected by Francis James Child published during the English revival in the 19th century. During the English folksong revival, English artists scrambled to compose a national identity consisting of England's past folksongs and their contemporary musical influences. Authors such as Francis James Child, Arthur Hugh Clough, and Chaucer made English folksong supranational due to the willingness to import other languages' words, pronunciations, and metres. Other examples of non-Christian influences include the Wild Hunt which originates from wider Europe, and Herne the Hunter which relates to the Germanic deity Woden. The Abbots Bromley Horn Dance may represent a pre-Christian festival and the practice of Well dressing in the Peak District, which may date back to Anglo-Saxon or even Celtic times. May Day celebrations such as the Maypole survive across much of England and Northern Europe. Christmas practices such as decorating trees, the significance of holly, and Christmas carolling were born from the desire to escape from the harshness of winter around Europe.

These combine to form a folklore which teaches that, through an upright and virtuous character, a person can achieve a successful life. Lullabies, songs, dances, games, folktales, and superstitions all imparted a religious and moral education, and form a person's sense of justice and Christianity. Children's games would often contain counting songs or gamifications of manners to ensure that a child was happy, healthy, and good.

English folklore also included beliefs of the supernatural, including premonitions, curses, and magic, and was common across all social classes. It was not regarded with the same validity as scientific discoveries, but was made to be trusted by the repeated accounts of a magician or priest's clients who saw the ritual's spectacle and so believed in its efficacy. Even when such rituals failed, such as a 15th-century physician using a golden artifact to heal his patients, their failures were attributed to the fickleness of magic.

As for English folktales, some such as Weber argue that they were passed down for the purpose of reflecting the grim realities of a child's life and hence instilled valued English morals and aesthetics. Others such as Tatar would counter that these folktales' fantasies were so removed from reality that they were a form of escapism, imaginative expression, and linguistic appreciation. Most folklorists would agree that the purpose of English folklore is to protect, entertain, and instruct on how to participate in a just and fair society.

Folktales 
Folklorists have developed frameworks such as the Aarne–Thompson-Uther index which categorise folktales first by types of folktales and then by consistent motifs. While these stories and characters have differences according to the region of their origin, these motifs are such that there is a national identity of folktales through which these regions have interacted.

There are likely many characters and stories that have never been recorded and hence were forgotten, but these folktales and their evolutions were often a product of contemporary figures, places, or events local to specific regions. The below are only a small fraction of examples from the folktale types of English folklore.

Creatures 
A dragon is a giant winged reptile that breathes fire or poison and is usually associated with waterfalls. The dragon is also present in Chinese, Egyptian, Mesoamerican and many other mythologies of the world. In the cultures of India, they are found in the mythologies and folklore of Jainism, Hinduism, and Buddhism.

A Wyvern is a smaller relative of dragons with two legs rather than four. It also has smaller wings and cannot breathe fire.

The black dog is a creature which foreshadows calamity or causes it. It is a combination of Odysseus' Argos and Hades' Cerberus from Greek mythology, and Fenrir from Norse mythology. The first collection of sightings of the black dog around Great Britain, Ethel Rudkin's 1938 article reports that the dog has black fur, abnormally large eyes, and a huge body. The black dog is a common motif in folklore and appears in many traditional English stories and tales. They often denote death and misfortune close at hand and appear and disappear into thin air. 

A boggart is, depending on local or regional tradition, a malevolent genius loci inhabiting fields, marshes or other topographical features. The household boggart causes objects to disappear, milk to sour, and dogs to go lame. They can possess small animals, fields, churches, or houses so they can play tricks on the civilians with their chilling laugh. Always malevolent, the boggart will follow its family wherever they flee. In Northern England, at least, there was the belief that the boggart should never be named, for when the boggart was given a name, it could not be reasoned with nor persuaded, but would become uncontrollable and destructive.

A brownie is a type of hob (household spirit), similar to a hobgoblin. Brownies are said to inhabit houses and aid in tasks around the house. However, they do not like to be seen and will only work at night, traditionally in exchange for small gifts or food. Among food, they especially enjoy porridge and honey. They usually abandon the house if their gifts are called payments, or if the owners of the house misuse them. Brownies make their homes in an unused part of the house.

A dwarf is a human-shaped entity that dwells in mountains and in the earth, and is associated with wisdom, smithing, mining, and crafting. The term had only started to be used in the 19th century as a translation for the German, French, and Scandinavian words which describe dwarves.

Ogres are usually tall, strong, violent, greedy, and remarkably dull monsters and they originate from French culture. In folktales they are likely to be defeated by being outsmarted.

The Will-o'-the-wisp is a folk explanation of strange, flickering lights seen around marshes and bogs. Some perceive them as souls of unbaptized infants which lead travellers off the forest path and into danger, while others perceive them as trickster fairies or sprites.

Characters and personifications 

King Arthur is the legendary king of the Britons, the Once and Future King and True Born King of England. The origins of King Arthur and his exploits are vague due to the many reproductions of his character. The  and the  reference many battles of an Arthur, ' also referencing Mordred, a rival, and Merlin, a wise mentor. Although these sources have been used as proof for Arthur's origins, their credibility has been disputed as mythology rather than history.

Robin Hood was a vicious outlaw who expressed the working-class' disenchantment with the status quo. Through Robin Hood, the forest (called the "greenwood" by folklorists) transformed from the dangerous, mystical battleground of Arthur to a site of sanctuary, comradery, and lawlessness. Rather than a philanthropic thief of the rich, Robin Hood's tales began in the 15th century as a brutal outlaw, ballads revelling in his violent retaliation to threats. Robin Hood fought to protect himself and his group the Merry Men, regardless the class, age, or gender of their enemy. In stories such as 'Robin Hood and the Widow's Three Sons' and 'The Tale of Gamelyn', the joyful ending is in the hanging of the sheriff and the officials; in 'Robin Hood and the Monk', Robin Hood kills a monk and his young helper. Paradoxical to English values of strict adherence to the law and honour, Robin Hood was glorified in ballads and stories for his banishment from society.

Robin Goodfellow, or Puck, is a shape-changing fairy known for his tricks. Since some English superstition suspected that fairies were demons, 17th century publications such as 'Robin Good-Fellow, his Mad Prankes and Merry Jests' and 'The Anatomy of Melancholy' portrayed him as a demon.

Lob, also called loby, looby, lubbard, lubber, or lubberkin, is the name given to a fairy with a dark raincloud as a body. It has a mischievous character and can describe any fairy-like creature from British folklore. It can be confused with Lob Lie-By-The-Fire, a strong, hairy giant which helps humans.

Stories 

Beowulf is an anonymous Old English historical epic of 3182 lines which describes the adventures of its titular character, prince Beowulf of Geats. The story goes that Beowulf slays Grendel, a monster who has tormented the hall of Hrothgar King of the Danes for twelve years. Grendel's mother seeks to gain revenge and Beowulf slays her also, after which Beowulf becomes king of the Danes himself. After 50 years, Beowulf's people are tormented by a dragon and Beowulf dies while slaying her. Original speculation was that Beowulf was a Scandinavian epic translated to English, theorised due to the story's Scandinavian settings. However, Beowulf was cemented as an Old English epic through the study that heroes of folklore are not ordinarily natives of the country they save.

The Brown Lady of Raynham is a story of the ghost of a woman of Norfolk, Lady Dorothy Walpole. After her adultery was discovered, she was confined to her chambers until death and roamed the halls of Raynham, named after the brown brocade she wears. Differing versions of the story attest that she was locked in by her husband, Lord Townsend, or by the Countess of Wharton.

The Legend of the Mistletoe Bough is a ghost story which has been associated with many mansions and stately homes in England. The tale describes how a new bride, playing a game of hide-and-seek during her wedding breakfast, hid in a chest in an attic and was unable to escape. She was not discovered by her family and friends, and suffocated. The body was allegedly found many years later in the locked chest.

Other types of folklore

Beliefs and motifs 
Standing stones are man-made stone structures made to stand up. Some small standing stones can also be arranged in groups to form miniliths. Similar to these geological artefacts are hill figures. These are figures drawn into the countryside by digging into the ground and sometimes filling it in with a mineral of a contrasting colour. Examples are the Cerne Abbas Giant, the Uffington White Horse, and the Long Man of Wilmington and are the focus for folktales and beliefs.

The Green Man is a description originating in 1939 which describes the engraved sculpture of a face with leaves growing from it in English architecture. His presence symbolises nature, but he is depicted differently according to where he is engraved and who carves him; on a church he may symbolise either inspiration or lust, or he may symbolise an ancient protector of travellers in a forest. The phrase originated from 'whifflers' who dressed in leaves or hair to make way for processions during pageants from the 15th to 18th centuries.

There was a belief that those born at the chime hours could see ghosts. The time differed according to region, usually based around the times of monk's prayer which were sometimes marked by a chime.

Crop circles are formations of flattened cereal. While they have been speculated to have mysterious and often extraterrestrial origins, most crop circles have been proven to be hoaxes. Those made by Doug Bower and Dave Chorley across England in 1991 have since started chains of copycats around the world.

Cunning folk was a term used to refer to male and female healers, magicians, conjurers, fortune-tellers, potion-makers, exorcists, or thieves. Such people were respected, feared and sometimes hunted for their breadth of knowledge which was suspected as supernatural.

The wild hunt was a description of a menacing group of huntsmen which either rode across the sky or on lonely roads. Their presence was a hallmark of the perception of the countryside as a wild and mystical place.

Practices 

On May Day, the first day of May, a tall, decorated pole is put up as a symbol of fertility called a maypole. The maypole represents a phallic object impregnating the earth at the end of spring to ensure a bountiful summer. The maypoles were decorated originally with flowers and carved from the branches of trees about to bloom to symbolise the birth of new life. Eventually the flowers were replaced with ribbons and May day became a day for celebration and dancing in which a May queen and sometimes a May king would be crowned to also symbolise fertility.

A parish ale is a type of party in the parish usually held to fundraise money for a particular purpose.

Plough Monday was a custom in which, on the first Monday after Christmas, men visited people's doorsteps at night and asked for a token for the holiday. They carried whips and a makeshift plough and dug up the house's doorstep or scraper if the house refused to give them an item.

Corn dollies are a form of straw work made as part of harvest customs of Europe before the First World War. Their use varied according to region: it may have been decorative, an image of pride for the harvest, or a way to mock nearby farms which had not yet collected their harvest. There has been a recent resurgence in their creation lead by Minnie Lambeth in the 1950s and 1960s through her book A Golden Dolly: The Art, Mystery, and History of Corn Dollies.

A superstition among children was that, if the first word uttered in the month was "Rabbit!", then that person would have good luck for the rest of the month. Variants include: "rabbit, rabbit, rabbit!", "rabbit, rabbit, white rabbit!", and "white rabbit!".

After a person died, a poor person was hired to take on their sins by eating before or after the funeral over their body- a sin-eater. The sin-eater would hence ensure that the recently deceased would be taken to heaven.

Items 
Sir Francis Drake's Drum is a legend about the drum of an English admiral who raided Spanish treasure fleets and Spanish ports. He was believed to have white magic which enabled him to turn into a dragon (as hinted by his name, Drake meaning dragon in Latin). When he died, the drum which he brought on his voyage around the world was sung about- that in England's peril, they could strike it and he would come to their aid. Eventually the legend evolved to be that the drum would strike itself in England's peril, and it has been heard struck since.

A hagstone, also called a holed stone or adder stone, is a type of stone, usually glassy, with a naturally occurring hole through it. Such stones have been discovered by archaeologists in both Britain and Egypt. In England it was used as a counter-charm for sleep paralysis, called hag-riding by tradition.

A petrifying well is a well which, when items are placed into it, they appear to be covered in stone. Items also acquire a stony texture when left in the well for an extended period of time. Examples in England include Mother Shipton's Cave in Knaresborough and Matlock Bath in Derbyshire.

Common folklore 
Charivari
Elfshot
Merry England
Nursery rhyme / Mother Goose
Saint George's Day in England
Tudor myth

Folklore local to specific areas

Folklore of East Anglia 

St. Audrey
Babes in the Wood at Wayland Wood
The Black Shuck – A Black Dog
Borley Rectory
Caxton Gibbet
St. Edmund of East Anglia
Green children of Woolpit
St. Guthlac of Croyland
Hereward the Wake
Hyter sprites

Jack Valentine
The mermaid of Upper Sheringham
Molly dance
King Cole and St. Helena
The Pedlar of Swaffham
Religious visions at Walsingham
Tom Hickathrift
Turpin's Cave
Witch Bottles Bottles filled with nails buried under the hearth to ward off evil spirits.
Gnome A small fat creature depicted with a white beard and moustache. (Female: Wombies).

Folklore of London and the South East 

Sir Bevis of Hampton
Biddenden Maids
Bran the Blessed's Head at the Tower of London
Brutus of Troy, the legendary founder of London
Clapham Wood, an area of strange activity
Devil's Jumps, Churt
Devil's Jumps, Treyford
Devil's Punch Bowl
Electric Horror of Berkeley Square
St. Frideswide
Ghost of Rahere
Gog and Magog, legendary giants and guardians of the City of London
Hengest and Horsa, legendary founders of Saxon England
Herne the Hunter – a related to the Wild Hunt
Highgate Vampire
Hoodening
Kit's Coty House
Lady Lovibond
Lazy Laurence

London Bridge is falling down
London Stone
King Lud, connected with the City of London
Mallard Song
Mowing-Devil of Hertfordshire
Oranges and Lemons
The Ratman of Southend
Theatre Royal, Drury Lane
Ravens of the Tower of London
Rollright Stones
Stockwell ghost
Spring Heeled Jack
Swan Upping
Swearing on the Horns
Wayland the Smith
Yernagate, the giant guardian of the New forest

Folklore of the Midlands 

Alkborough Turf Maze
Belgrave Hall and its ghosts
Black Annis
Black Lady of Bradley Woods
Border Morris
Bottle-kicking
Byard's Leap
Chained Oak
The Derby Ram
Dun Cow
Fulk FitzWarin
Godiva
Guy of Warwick
Haxey Hood Game
Jack of Kent
Lincoln Imp

Little Saint Hugh of Lincoln
Madam Pigott
Major Oak
Mermaid's Pool
Nanny Rutt
Old Jeffrey
Relics of St. Oswald
Robin Hood
Royal Shrovetide Football
Stiperstones
Tiddy Mun
Wise Men of Gotham
Witches of Belvoir
The Giant of the Wrekin
Yallery-Brown

Folklore of Yorkshire and the North East 

The Barghest
The Cauld Lad of Hylton
St. Cuthbert
The Devil's Arrows
Duergar
The Hedley Kow
Jack-In-Irons
Jenny Greenteeth
Jingling Geordie's Hole
Halifax Gibbet
Kilburn White Horse

Laidly Worm
The Lambton Worm
Legend of Upsall Castle
Long Sword dance
My Own Self
Peg Powler
Rapper sword
Redcap
Robin Hood
Sedgefield Ball Game
Ursula Southeil

Folklore of the North West

The Wizard of Alderley Edge
Folklore of Lancashire
Furness Abbey and its ghosts
Gytrash

John Middleton
Long Meg and Her Daughters
Pendle Witches
Samlesbury witches
Wild Boar of Westmorland

Folklore of the South West 

Abbotsbury Garland Day
Barber surgeon of Avebury
Tom Bawcock
Belas Knap
Bowerman's Nose
Brutus Stone
Cerne Abbas Giant
Cheese rolling
Childe's Tomb
Corineus, legendary founder of Cornwall
Crazywell Pool
Devil's Footprints
Dorset Ooser
St. Dunstan is the origin of the lucky horseshoe
Folklore of Stonehenge
Glastonbury and its abbey
Glastonbury Thorn
Goblin Combe

Hairy hands
Hunky punk
Jack the Giant Killer and Galligantus
Jan Tregeagle
Jay's Grave
Lyonesse
Moonrakers, the story of how the inhabitants of Wiltshire got their nickname
The Obby Oss of Padstow
Pixies
Punkie Night
The Great Thunderstorm, Widecombe
Three hares (Tinners' Rabbits)
Tintagel, legendary birthplace of King Arthur
Warren House Inn
Widecombe Fair
Witch of Wookey Hole

See also
Cornish mythology
English mythology
Once upon a time
Scottish mythology
Welsh mythology

Cycles of legend in the British Isles 
Matter of Britain
Matter of England

Related figures 
Cecil Sharp
Sabine Baring-Gould

References

Sources

Further reading
 Briggs, K. M. "Possible Mythological Motifs in English Folktales". Folklore 83, no. 4 (1972): 265–71. Retrieved June 18, 2020. .
 Williamson, Craig; Kramer, Michael P; Lerner, L. Scott (2011). A Feast of Creatures: Anglo-Saxon Riddle-Songs. Philadelphia: University of Pennsylvania Press. .
 Sax, Boria (2015). "The Magic of Animals: English Witch Trials in the Perspective of Folklore". Anthrozoös. 22: 317–332 – via Taylor & Francis Online.
 Keegan-Phipps, Simon (29 Mar 2017). "Identifying the English: essentialism and multiculturalism in contemporary English folk music". Ethnomusicology Forum. 26: 3–25 – via Taylor & Francis Online.
 
 
 Opie, Iona; Tatem, Moira (1992). A Dictionary of Superstitions. New York: Oxford University Press. .
 Paynter, William H.; Semmens, Jason (2008). The Cornish Witch-finder: William Henry Paynter and the Witchery, Ghosts, Charms and Folklore of Cornwall. .
 Vickery, Roy (1995). A dictionary of plant-lore. New York: Oxford University Press. .
 Westwood, Jennifer; Simpson, Jacqueline (2005). The Lore of the Land: A Guide to England's Legends, from Spring-heeled Jack to the Witches of Warboys. Penguin Books. .
 Wright, Arthur Robinson (2013). English Folklore. Read Books. .
 Fee, Christopher R.; Leeming, David Adams (2004). Gods, Heroes, & Kings: The Battle for Mythic Britain. Oxford University Press. .

External links
"Popular Rhymes and Nursery Tales" (1849), by James Halliwell, a discussion on the origin of English folk tales and rhymes.
"Weather and Folk Lore of Peterborough and District:, by Charles Dack, 1911, from Project Gutenberg
Project-IONA a repository of folk tales from England and the islands of the North Atlantic
Folklore Society (UK)
Pretanic World – Folklore and Folkbeliefs
Dartmoor Legends

 
Folklore